Luke Magill (born 10 September 1987) is an English footballer, who plays for Dayton Dutch Lions in the USL Professional Division.

Career

Youth and Amateur
Magill played in the youth team of English Premier League club Bolton Wanderers, before coming to the United States in 2007 after being offered a college soccer scholarship by the University of South Florida. After taking a year out in 2008, he transferred to Lynn University prior to his sophomore year, playing in 19 games and scoring 1 goal during his first year with the college.

During his college years he also played with the Long Island Rough Riders
and the Baton Rouge Capitals in the USL Premier Development League, helping the Capitals to the PDL national semi-finals in 2010.

Professional
Magill left school early and turned professional in 2011 when he signed with the Dayton Dutch Lions in the USL Professional Division. He made his professional debut on 16 April 2011 in Dayton's first game of the 2011 season, a 2–1 loss to Charleston Battery.

References

External links
Dayton Dutch Lions profile
Lynn bio

1987 births
Living people
English footballers
Bolton Wanderers F.C. players
South Florida Bulls men's soccer players
Long Island Rough Riders players
Baton Rouge Capitals players
Dayton Dutch Lions players
USL League Two players
USL Championship players
Lynn Fighting Knights men's soccer players
Association football midfielders
Association football defenders
English expatriate sportspeople in the United States
Expatriate soccer players in the United States
English expatriate footballers